Mi nombre es amor is a 1987 Venezuelan telenovela produced by Venevisión and distributed internationally by Venevisión International. Mimí Lazo and Jean Carlo Simancas starred as the main protagonists.

Plot
Alejandra Espinel's life changes suddenly when she is left a widow and her stable life is turned into chaos. She is forced to deal with the loss of her husband, the treachery of his associate, bankruptcy and her two adolescent boys lost in the confusion of life. As she struggles to put her life in order, she will rediscover love in Joaquin, the same person she regarded as her enemy. But their love will be disrupted by the appearance of Aida, Joaquin's wife who abandoned him a year ago.

Cast
Mimí Lazo as Alejandra Espinel
Jean Carlo Simancas as Joaquin Almada

References

External links

1987 telenovelas
Venevisión telenovelas
Spanish-language telenovelas
1987 Venezuelan television series debuts
1987 Venezuelan television series endings
Venezuelan telenovelas
Television shows set in Venezuela